Givira australis is a moth in the family Cossidae. It is found in Chile.

References

Natural History Museum Lepidoptera generic names catalog

Givira
Endemic fauna of Chile
Moths described in 1957